U.S. Highway 169 (U.S. 169) is a major north–south highway in the U.S. state of Minnesota, connecting the Minnesota River valley with the Twin Cities and the Iron Range.  Much of the route is built to expressway or freeway standards.

Route description

U.S. 169 enters Minnesota near Elmore as a two-lane, undivided highway, continuing as such through the majority of Blue Earth. Near the northern outskirts of the town, it expands to a four-lane, divided highway, subsequently crossing Interstate Highway 90. Soon after, it reverts to its original two-lane size. Roughly 5 miles southwest of Mankato, U.S. 169 and State Highway 60 merge to a single expressway through Mankato. In North Mankato, Highway 60 moves from a concurrency with U.S. 169 to another one with U.S. 14.

In Mankato and North Mankato, U.S. 169 functions as an arterial highway, passing directly through the cities' downtown area.  From Mankato north to Jackson Township, the route remains an expressway, except for the section passing through St. Peter, where U.S. 169 is the main street through town.

 of U.S. 169 from St. Peter to I-494 in Bloomington is officially designated the John A. Johnson Memorial Highway.  This includes the Bloomington Ferry Bridge between Shakopee and Bloomington.  This designation is marked as "Johnson Memorial Drive" on some maps, but not marked as such on directional signs, nor commonly known by this name.

In the Twin Cities area, the route is constructed to freeway standards between State Highway 41 in Jackson Township and 109th Avenue North in Brooklyn Park . The freeway between Interstate 494 and Interstate 694 was originally built by Hennepin County as County Road 18.  In 1988, County Road 18 was transferred to the state of Minnesota and became the new alignment for Highway 169 in the Minneapolis area. In exchange, Hennepin County took over maintenance of two other highways that were formerly state routes. In the Minneapolis area, U.S. 169 is often congested, but the freeway passes close to residential neighborhoods in many locations, so any expansion of the freeway would disrupt housing stock in the surrounding area.

From 109th Avenue North to the Mississippi River, U.S. 169 remains an expressway until Anoka, where it becomes a street. It then joins U.S. 10 west to Elk River. Those highways diverge at Babcock Wayside on the Mississippi River.

North of the Twin Cities metropolitan area, U.S. 169 continues as an expressway to Mille Lacs Lake, an important resort area.  The highway skirts the western shore of the lake.   of U.S. 169 from Elk River to Garrison is officially designated the POW / MIA Memorial Highway.  From Mille Lacs Lake, U.S. 169  continues northward to its junction with U.S. 2 at Grand Rapids.  Here, 169 turns northeasterly to reach the cities of the Mesabi Iron Range.

At the eastern end of Grand Rapids, U.S. 169 becomes an expressway and remains such for 8 miles. An additional 1.5 miles, from Taconite to Itasca County Road 7; will be complete in 2016. It passes through the cities of Hibbing, Chisholm, and Mountain Iron before reaching U.S. 53 at the city of Virginia.  This four-lane stretch of 169 is also known as the Highway 169 Cross Range Expressway. The northern terminus of U.S. 169 is at the city of Virginia.

State Highway 169 is numbered as an extension of U.S. 169.

U.S. 169 is one of three Minnesota U.S. marked highways to carry the same number as an existing state marked highway within the state.  The others being Highways 61 and 65.

Legally, the Minnesota section of U.S. 169 is defined as all or part of Routes 5, 7, 383, 3, 18, and 35 in the Minnesota Statutes §§ 161.114(2) and 161.117(4).,  The route is not marked with those numbers.

History

U.S. 169 was extended into Minnesota .  The route in Minnesota was paved by 1940.

Previously, U.S. 169 served as the northern terminus of U.S. 53 in Virginia. U.S. 169 then continued north into International Falls. Today, U.S. 53 serves as the terminus of U.S. 169 in Virginia.

U.S. 169, between the junction with State Highway 60 (south of Mankato) and the Twin Cities, was upgraded to at least expressway status over several stages. The freeway section around Mankato and the adjoining expressway sections were completed in the early 1960s, along with bypasses of Le Sueur, Jordan and Belle Plaine.

The U.S. 169 freeway bypass around Shakopee was built in the mid-1990s along a new alignment, which included the newly constructed Bloomington Ferry Bridge. Prior to this realignment, U.S. 169 crossed the Minnesota River from downtown Shakopee where it had been co-signed with State Highway 101. North of the river crossing, U.S. 169 had previously been co-signed with what was then U.S. 212 (Flying Cloud Drive) through Eden Prairie until 1996.

A new U.S. 169 interchange with State Highway 19, near Henderson, was completed in 2002.

An expressway section of Highway 169 through southern Hennepin County was converted to full freeway in 2006, with new interchanges constructed at Pioneer Trail and Anderson Lakes Parkway. At-grade intersections with traffic signals have been removed at the recently constructed Interstate 494 interchange, which was previously a point of frequent congestion.

North of the Twin Cities, Highway 169 has been upgraded to an expressway between Elk River and the southern end of Mille Lacs Lake, with bypasses of Princeton and Milaca built in the late 1980s.

U.S. 169 between Hill City and Grand Rapids has been built to super-2 standards.

The expressway section between Pengilly and the city of Virginia was built in the late 1970s and early 1980s.

In 2008, construction began on a new Highway 169 interchange with County Road 81 and 85th Avenue North in Brooklyn Park.  This interchange is also known as The Devil's Triangle, or simply as "The Triangle", because of the major traffic congestion during rush hour, especially in the afternoon.  Construction was completed on August 11, 2011.

During the flooding of September 2010, flood waters destroyed a 150-foot section of the northbound lanes of Highway 169 between St. Peter and Le Sueur.  MnDOT believes, "when the flood waters rose up it found a weak spot in the slope or the dirt bank and got under the grass and started mining under the pavement. Finally, it just sucked all the dirt out and the pavement just dropped into a hole."  Traffic was detoured to the southbound lanes of 169 for a month, resulting in a temporary two lane expressway, until the northbound section was repaired.

In November 2010, construction began on a completely redesigned Highway 169 interchange at Interstate 494, where three traffic signals had existed.  The new interchange features six roundabouts, new flyover bridges, and two new bridges over I-494 that will carry West 78th Street and Washington Avenue.  Major construction began in March 2011.  Construction continued in spring 2012 with the completion of reconstructing surrounding roads and remaining ramps.  MnDOT completed the entire project in November 2012.  The 2010 cost of the construction project was $140 million.

In 2016, exit numbers have started appearing on the Shakopee portion of the freeway section in the Minneapolis-Saint Paul metro area.

Future
A study to convert U.S. 169 to a freeway between U.S. 10 in Elk River to 277th Avenue north of Zimmerman was completed in late 2009.  A complete review of the project by MnDOT will occur in 2011.  A complete construction schedule and timeline will then by released by MnDOT.  Allocation of funds for the project is currently underway and the only thing holding back from starting the project.  The project is expected to cost around $178 Million.  In the meantime, the 14 miles between U.S. 10 in Elk River to 277th Avenue north of Zimmerman will be resurfaced during the 2012 construction season.  The construction will begin in May 2012.

Major intersections

See also

References

69-1
 Minnesota
Transportation in Faribault County, Minnesota
Transportation in Blue Earth County, Minnesota
Transportation in Nicollet County, Minnesota
Transportation in Sibley County, Minnesota
Transportation in Le Sueur County, Minnesota
Transportation in Scott County, Minnesota
Transportation in Hennepin County, Minnesota
Transportation in Anoka County, Minnesota
Transportation in Sherburne County, Minnesota
Transportation in Mille Lacs County, Minnesota
Transportation in Aitkin County, Minnesota
Transportation in Crow Wing County, Minnesota
Transportation in Itasca County, Minnesota
Transportation in St. Louis County, Minnesota